Speech technology relates to the technologies designed to duplicate and respond to the human voice. They have many uses. These include aid to the voice-disabled, the hearing-disabled, and the blind, along with communication with computers without a keyboard. They enhance game software and aid in marketing goods or services by telephone.

The subject includes several subfields:

 Speech synthesis
 Speech recognition
 Speaker recognition
 Speaker verification
 Speech encoding
 Multimodal interaction

See also 
 Communication aids
 Language technology
 Speech interface guideline
 Speech processing
 Speech Technology (magazine)

External links

Speech processing

da:Taleteknologi
fi:Puheteknologia
th:การประมวลผลคำพูด